MSM-1 USEL (Unità di Soccorso E Lavoro - Rescue and Work Vessel) was a deep-submergence rescue vehicle (DSRV) that was rated to dive up to . It was built by Cantieri Navali Ernesto Breda/Fincantieri for the Marina Militare. MSM-1 USEL was hosted by mother ship  at La Spezia from 1980 to 2002. That year MSM-1 USEL was replaced by the DRASS Galeazzi SRV-300.

Characteristics 

MSM-1 USEL was the first submersible vehicle for underwater research and work of completely Italian conception. The basic design of MSM-1 USEL was done by ESCO of Milan. The pressure hull is made of HY-80 steel and subdivided in two compartments: a cylinder with hemispherical ends located aft, and a sphere forward, interconnected by a cylindrical tunnel. The afterbody is tapered and finishes with the propeller cone. Aft stability planes, two vertical and two horizontal, are arranged forward of the propeller.

History 
MSM-1 was updated (MLU - MidLife Update) in 1989 by MARITALIA of Fiumicino. Work took a year to complete and the vessel was renamed MSM-1S USEL.

Museum 
Since 8 September 2015 MSM-1S USEL has been held by the Museo Tecnico Navale (Naval Technical Museum)  of La Spezia and now is preserved for the public.

References 

Submarines of the Italian Navy
Deep-submergence rescue vehicles
Ships built in Venice
1980 ships
Ships built by Fincantieri